Sampsel Township is a township in Livingston County, in the U.S. state of Missouri.

Sampsel Township was established in 1874, taking its name from the community of Sampsel, Missouri.

References

Townships in Missouri
Townships in Livingston County, Missouri